Casa Palmitjavila  is a town house located at Avinguda Carlemany, 79 Escaldes, Escaldes-Engordany Parish, Andorra. It is a heritage property registered in the Cultural Heritage of Andorra. It was built in 1953–56.

References

Escaldes-Engordany
Houses in Andorra
Houses completed in 1956
Cultural Heritage of Andorra